Ethelind Terry (14 August 1899 – 17 March 1984) was an American stage and film actress.

Career 
Terry starred in one of the most famous Broadway shows of the 1920s, the musical Rio Rita produced by Florenz Ziegfeld.  She also starred in the film Lord Byron of Broadway.

Marriages
Terry married Benedict Bogeaus in 1928.  They divorced in 1931 and continued a strained relationship for 11 years.

Terry eloped to Las Vegas with the actor Dick Purcell. The two married on March 3, 1942, only to divorce on August 26, 1942.

Theatrical appearances
Honeydew (Broadway, premiered September 6, 1920)
Kid Boots (Broadway, premiered December 31, 1923)
Rio Rita (Broadway, premiered February 2, 1927)
Nina Rosa  (Broadway, premiered September 20, 1930)

Filmography
Music Box Revue (1923), Pathé film of C. B. Cochran's London production including Terry performing with Renie Riano
Lord Byron of Broadway (1930)
 Nertsery Rhymes (1933), The Woman in the Shoe Scene from Lord Byron of Broadway
Arizona Days (1937)

References

External links 
 

1899 births
1984 deaths
American stage actresses
Actresses from Philadelphia
American film actresses
20th-century American actresses